Stelis trichostoma is a species of orchid plant native to Ecuador.

References 

trichostoma
Flora of Ecuador